Rodica Frîntu (born 29 March 1960) is a retired Romanian rower who won a bronze medal at the 1980 Olympics.

References

External links 
 
 
 
 

Romanian female rowers
Olympic rowers of Romania
Rowers at the 1980 Summer Olympics
Olympic bronze medalists for Romania
Olympic medalists in rowing
Medalists at the 1980 Summer Olympics
1960 births
Living people
20th-century Romanian women